Lion Roar is Taiwanese Mandopop artist Show Lo's tenth Mandarin studio album. It was released on 8 November 2013 by Sony Music Entertainment (Taiwan), which was also his first studio album released by the company after he joined in August 2013. The album was available for pre-order from 16 October 2013. On 6 December 2013, Lion Roar - Dance Soul Returns Encore Edition (獅子吼 之 舞魂再現 冠軍Encore版) was released, featuring three new tracks, and three remix tracks from Lion Roar.

Track listing

Music videos

References

External links
  Show Lo @ Sony Music Entertainment (Taiwan)
  羅志祥 官方專屬頻道 Show's Official Youtube Channel

2013 albums
Show Lo albums
Sony Music albums